Ganga Baba, or Gangu Baba was a participant in  Indian Rebellion of 1857.He  belonged to Valmiki community living around Bithoor village of Uttar Pradesh.

Story in oral tradition
There are many stories about the bravery and good deeds of Gangu Baba. While he was returning from forest with dead tiger on his back. Nana Saheb Peshwa then the king of Bithoor passed with his army from that place. He saw Gangu Baba with a tiger on his back. He was extremely impressed and asked Gangu Baba to join his army as he already had initiated a battle against Britishers at that time. Gangu Baba readily accepted.

According to oral traditions of Dalits in the villages near Bithoor, he alone killed 150 British soldiers with his sword. This annoyed the Britishers who issued circulars to arrest him dead or alive. Ultimately, he was arrested. The British soldiers tied him to a horse and dragged his body up to Kanpur. Then they hanged him in Chunniganj.

See also
 Matadin Bhangi

References

Indian independence movement
Revolutionaries of the Indian Rebellion of 1857
1859 deaths